Kappis is a surname. Notable people with the surname include:

Albert Kappis (1836–1914), German painter and lithographer
Giorgos Kappis (1928–1999), Greek actor